Stills is the second and final studio album by American band Gauntlet Hair. It was released in July 2013 under Dead Ocean Records.

Track listing

References

External links
Stills by Gauntlet Hair at iTunes.com

2013 albums
Gauntlet Hair albums